Seredneye is a rural locality (a village) in Kubenskoye Rural Settlement, Vologodsky District, Vologda Oblast, Russia. The population was 13 as of 2002.

Geography 
Seredneye is located 64 km northwest of Vologda (the district's administrative centre) by road. Severnaya Ferma is the nearest rural locality.

References 

Rural localities in Vologodsky District